The smalleye smooth-hound (Mustelus higmani) is a houndshark of the family Triakidae. It is found on the continental shelves of the western Atlantic, between latitudes 11° N and 36° S, from the surface to a depth of 900 m. It can grow up to a length of 70 cm. The reproduction of this shark is viviparous, with 1 to 7 pups per litter.

References

smalleye smooth-hound
Fish of the Western Atlantic
smalleye smooth-hound